Brethren is an unincorporated community and census-designated place in Dickson Township, Manistee County, Michigan, United States. Its population was 410 as of the 2010 census. Brethren has a post office with ZIP code 49619.

Brethren was founded in 1900 by Samuel S. Thorpe as a colony of the German Baptist Brethren Church. A post office was established in 1901 with Thorpe as the first postmaster. The Pere Marquette Railway established a station here in 1901.

References

Unincorporated communities in Manistee County, Michigan
Unincorporated communities in Michigan
Census-designated places in Manistee County, Michigan
Census-designated places in Michigan